Kyle Kushman is the pen name of Adam Orenstein, an American writer, educator, activist and award-winning cannabis cultivator and breeder specializing in veganic cultivation.

He is known for his organic farming techniques such as super cropping, pruning, drying and curing, as well as processing cannabis flowers into extracts. He is a former cultivation reporter for High Times Magazine, has been a contributing writer for over 20 years, and has taught courses in advanced horticulture at Oaksterdam University in Oakland, California and across the United States.

His collaborations have earned multiple High Times Cannabis Cup awards, and he is credited with breeding Joey's Strain and Cherry Lopez.

Kushman hosts a podcast called The Grow Show with Kyle Kushman on CannabisRadio.com. Guests have included Danny Danko, Ed Rosenthal, Dr. Lester Grinspoon, Alison Holcomb, Ken Estes, Rick Cusick, Jeff Mizanskey, Mieko Hester-Perez, Chris Conrad and Mikki Norris.

Kyle also works as an indoor growing expert and runs his educational blog on the Homegrown Сannabis Co. website and YouTube channel.

References

External links

Year of birth missing (living people)
American cannabis activists
Living people
American horticulture businesspeople